The 2019–20 Women's Senior T20 Trophy was the 12th edition of the women's Twenty20 cricket competition in India. It was held from 14 October to 10 November 2019. Punjab were the defending champions. Chandigarh made their debut in the tournament after the BCCI granted affiliation to the Union Territory Cricket Association.

The tournament's league stage consisted of five groups, with three groups containing seven teams and two group with eight teams. The league stage ran from 14 October to 24 October. The top two teams from each group qualified for the Super League stage of the tournament, with the teams split into two further groups of five teams. Andhra and Jharkhand from Group A, Railways and Vidarbha from Group B, Karnataka and Baroda from Group C, Himachal Pradesh and Uttar Pradesh from Group D, Bengal and Maharashtra from Group E qualified for the Super League stage. The Super League stage ran from 31 October to 6 November 2019. The top 2 teams from both groups, Bengal and Vidarbha from Super League Group A and Railways and Baroda from Super League Group B, progressed to the semi-finals. The semi-finals and final were held on 8 and 10 November 2019 respectively. In the semi-finals, Bengal beat Baroda by 6 wickets and Railways beat Uttar Pradesh by 75 runs. Both the teams progressed unbeaten to final. In the final, Railways defeated Bengal by 8 wickets to win the tournament for the 9th time.

League stage

Points table
Group A

Group B

Group C

Group D

Group E

Fixtures

Group A

Group B

Group C

Group D

Group E

Super League Stage

Points table

Super League Group A

Super League Group B

Fixtures

Super League Group A

Super League Group B

Knockout stage

Semi-finals

Final

References

Women's Senior T20 Trophy
Senior Women's T20 League
Senior Women's T20 League